is a railway station in Tokyo, Japan, operated by East Japan Railway Company (JR East). It opened on 20 June 1929.

Lines
Oku Station is served by the following lines.
 Utsunomiya Line (Tōhoku Main Line)
 Takasaki Line

Layout
This station consists of a single island platform serving two tracks.

References

Railway stations in Tokyo
Tōhoku Main Line
Utsunomiya Line
Railway stations in Japan opened in 1929